Loaded Records was a British dance record label, formed in 1990 by Tim Jeffery and JC Reid. It launched artists like Pizzaman, Slacker and Wildchild. More recently, it released albums by Super Collider (featuring Jamie Lidell) and singles by Annie and Holden & Thompson. They also launched Skint Records as an offshoot.

The label enjoyed chart success again in 2005 with the Freemasons, who hit the top 20 with "Love On My Mind" and "Watchin'"; in both instances featuring Amanda Wilson.

Loaded and Skint Records were acquired by BMG in 2014.

See also
 List of record labels
 List of electronic music record labels

References

External links
 Official site
 

British record labels
Record labels established in 1990
English electronic dance music record labels
Electronic music record labels